Mbutu Bridge is a bridge currently under construction in Tanzania that will link Mbutu with Igunga.

References

Buildings and structures under construction in Tanzania
Bridges in Tanzania